The Lebanon Valley is a geographic region that lies between South Mountain and the Ridge and Valley Province of eastern Pennsylvania.  The valley lies almost entirely within Lebanon and Berks counties in Pennsylvania. Portions of the valley lie in eastern Dauphin and northern Lancaster counties in Pennsylvania. It is bound to its southwest by the Susquehanna River and to its northeast by the adjoining Lehigh Valley.

The Lebanon Valley is part of the much longer Great Appalachian Valley, also called the Great Valley, a natural lowland route running northeast–southwest and lying just inland from the Blue Ridge Mountains and South Mountain.  The Great Valley, including the Lebanon Valley, has historically been admired for its fertile agricultural land.  Beyond the southwestern end of the Lebanon Valley, the Great Valley is known locally as the Cumberland Valley. To the northeast the Great Valley is known locally as the Lehigh Valley. Lebanon Valley College is named for the region. The western part of the valley lies within the Chesapeake Bay watershed. The eastern part lies within the Delaware River watershed.

Principal cities in the Lebanon Valley
Harrisburg, Pennsylvania
Annville, Pennsylvania
Hershey, Pennsylvania
Palmyra, Pennsylvania
Lebanon, Pennsylvania
Cornwall, Pennsylvania
Reading, Pennsylvania

See also
Great Appalachian Valley
Lebanon Valley College
Lebanon Valley Railroad
Susquehanna Valley

Geography of Harrisburg, Pennsylvania
Landforms of Dauphin County, Pennsylvania
Regions of Pennsylvania
Valleys of Pennsylvania